Maksim Pyatrovich Skavysh (born 13 November 1989) is a Belarusian professional footballer who plays for Shakhtyor Soligorsk as a forward.

Career
Skavysh began his playing career with BATE's reserve team, and joined the first team during the 2008 season when the club won the league.

Skavysh was a member of the Belarus U21 that finished in 3rd place at the 2011 UEFA European Under-21 Football Championship. He played in all five of the matches and scored in the 2:0 group stage win against Iceland U21. He also represented the Belarus Olympic team that participated in the 2012 Toulon Tournament and the 2012 Summer Olympics.

He made his debut for the Belarus national football team on 3 June 2013, in a friendly match against Estonia.

International goals
Scores and results list Belarus' goal tally first.

Honours
BATE Borisov
Belarusian Premier League: 2007, 2008, 2009, 2010, 2011, 2012, 2018
Belarusian Cup: 2009–10, 2019–20, 2020–21
Belarusian Super Cup: 2010, 2011

Torpedo-BelAZ Zhodino
Belarusian Cup: 2015–16

Shakhtyor Soligorsk
Belarusian Premier League: 2021, 2022
Belarusian Super Cup: 2023

References

External links
 Player profile on official FC BATE website
 
 

1989 births
Living people
Belarusian footballers
Footballers from Minsk
Association football forwards
Belarusian expatriate footballers
Expatriate footballers in Russia
Expatriate footballers in Israel
Belarusian expatriate sportspeople in Russia
Belarusian expatriate sportspeople in Israel
Belarus international footballers
Olympic footballers of Belarus
Footballers at the 2012 Summer Olympics
FC BATE Borisov players
FC Belshina Bobruisk players
FC Baltika Kaliningrad players
FC Torpedo-BelAZ Zhodino players
Hapoel Kfar Saba F.C. players
FC Shakhtyor Soligorsk players